Novokodatskyi District is an urban district of the city of Dnipro, in central Ukraine. It is in the western part of the city and borders the city of Kamianske.

History
The area of the district includes many former Cossack settlements among which are Diiivka, Novi Kodaky, Sukhachivka and others. Novi Kodaky was founded during the reign of Bohdan Khmelnytsky as Hetman of Zaporizhian Host and was the center of the "Kodak palanquin" of the Zaporozhian Sich. A trade route from Poltava passed through Novi Kodak. At the end of the 19th century the area became the center of the metallurgical industry of what is now Ukraine. The colony of the Bryansk plant was formed to house factory workers. Other settlements for laborers grew together with it: Chechelivka, Shlyakhovka and Fabryka. Near the factories a railway station – Horiayinove, a secondary school for 600 people and hospital were built. In 1928, the Ilyich Palace of Culture was built, and in 1936 the building of the Industrial Technical School was built.

The current district was created in 1940 out of the city's Kodatskyi and Fabrychno-Chechelivskyi districts. In 2006, the old Cossack town of Taromske, which was located between former Dnipropetrovsk and former Dniprodzerzhynsk (now Kamianske), was merged into the district. Taromske was located on the ancient road from Kyiv to Khortytsia.

Until 26 November 2015 the district was named after Vladimir Lenin (Leninskyi District); that day it was renamed to Novokodatskyi District to comply with decommunization laws.

Neighborhoods
 Bryanka
 Novi Kodaky (Novi Kaidaky)
 Diivka
 Diivka-2
 Chervony Kamin
 Pokrovsky
 Parus
 Sukhachivka
 Taromske
 Fabryka
 Krupske
 Nove
 Zakhidny

Gallery

References

External links

 Novokodatskyi District at the Dnipro City Council website 

Urban districts of Dnipro
States and territories established in 1920
1920 establishments in Ukraine